Zwankendamme is a village in the municipality of Bruges, West Flanders, Belgium.

Geography of Bruges
Populated places in West Flanders